Ádám Rothermel (born 14 June 1948) is a Hungarian footballer. He competed in the men's tournament at the 1972 Summer Olympics.

References

1948 births
Living people
Hungarian footballers
Hungary international footballers
Olympic footballers of Hungary
Footballers at the 1972 Summer Olympics
Footballers from Budapest
Association football goalkeepers
Olympic silver medalists for Hungary
Olympic medalists in football
Medalists at the 1972 Summer Olympics